Carl Maria von Bocklet (30 November 1801 – 15 July 1881) was a composer, pianist and teacher of music.

Bocklet was born in Prague.  He studied with Bedřich Diviš Weber and in 1821 he moved to Vienna, where he "created a great stir...through his interesting free fantasias on the piano forte." In Vienna, Eduard Marxsen was one of his notable students. Ludwig van Beethoven wrote letters of introduction for him, and he became a close friend of Franz Schubert; more than likely, he was influential to Frédéric Chopin.

In 1828 he was, with Ignaz Schuppanzigh and Joseph Linke, the first performer of Schubert's two piano trios (1827).

As Beethoven's letter of reference to Baron Nikolaus Zmeskall (1817?) testifies, von Bocklet was also a capable player of the violin.

Among his own compositions is a variation for Part II of Diabelli's Waltz of the Vaterländischer Künstlerverein.

Carl Maria von Bocklet died in Vienna, aged 79.

References

External links

1801 births
1881 deaths
Austrian male composers
Austrian composers
Austrian classical pianists
Male classical pianists
Musicians from Prague
19th-century composers
19th-century classical pianists
19th-century Czech male musicians